Yevgeniy Anikin (born 13 March 1958) is a former Soviet athlete. He competed in the men's triple jump at the 1980 Summer Olympics.

External link

References

1958 births
Living people
Athletes (track and field) at the 1980 Summer Olympics
Soviet male triple jumpers
Uzbekistani male triple jumpers
Olympic athletes of the Soviet Union